Thug Misses is the debut studio album by American rapper Khia. It was originally released on October 30, 2001, by Divine Records, followed by a wider release on April 23, 2002, by Dirty Down Records and Artemis Records. The album spawned the singles "My Neck, My Back (Lick It)" and "The K-Wang". Thug Misses was certified gold by the Recording Industry Association of America (RIAA) on September 20, 2002, and as of June 2007, it had sold 811,000 copies in the United States.

Background 
Recording for the album began in 2000 when Khia was signed to Divine Records; the album was originally released on October 30, 2001. However, Khia was displeased with the lack of promotion and proper charting performance, resulting in disputes between Khia and the record label executives (also resulting into Khia leaving the record label). The dispute would later develop over Khia's image and the lead single, "My Neck, My Back (Lick It)."

By the end of March 2002, Khia and her newly signed record label, Artemis, released "My Neck, My Back (Lick It)" as the official lead single; the song would go on to peak at number 42 on Billboard Hot 100 and number 20 on Billboard Hot R&B/Hip-Hop Songs and eventually being certified platinum in the US, making it Khia's most successful single to date. Khia and Artemis, later re-released "Thug Misses" as her official debut album. The album reached number 33 on the Billboard 200 and number 13 on Billboards Top R&B/Hip-Hop Albums chart.

Release and reception 
The album was released on April 23, 2002, to generally mixed reviews. David Jeffries of AllMusic gave the album 3/5 stars. He stated: "Khia's stuck-in-the-ghetto attitude is playful, honest, and endearing and carries her throughout the album, especially during the plentiful filler. Stripclub DJs and freaks of the night should track it down". Steve 'Flash' Juon of RapReviews later criticized the album, saying "In the end (no pun intended) Khia will definitely open eyes and turn heads with her debut album "Thug Misses" but doesn't have the music or the lyrics to carry forty-five plus minutes of rap on one album at this early point in her career. By combining her already confidant raps with some more divergent topics and an improved selection of beats, Khia may prove to have the staying power of her femme fatale contemporaries, but until then her debut album will have already taken up twelve of her fifteen minutes of fame. It's up to her to push the clock back and keep it ticking."

Singles
"My Neck, My Back (Lick It)" was released on March 30, 2002, as the lead single from the album. The song was produced by Michael "Taz" Williams and Plat'num House. To date, "My Neck, My Back (Lick It)" remains as Khia's most successful single as a leading artist.

"The K-Wang" was released on February 23, 2003, as the second and final single. An official single remix was produced by Jermaine Dupri. In 2022 Khia released the video to the song.

Track listing

Personnel
Credits for Thug Misses adapted from Allmusic.

Khia Chambers - Primary Artist, Composer
Markus Vance - Primary Artist, Composer, Featured Artist
Max "Oak" McCloughan - Executive Producer
ESQ. - Executive Producer
G. Love - Executive Producer
Shadow Harris - Executive Producer
Steve E. Machat - Executive Producer
Don Juan - Producer
Platinum House - Producer
Count Basie - Composer
DSD - Featured Artist
Lewis T. Bryant Jr. - Engineer
Mert Deezine - Cover Design

Charts

Weekly charts

Year-end charts

Certifications

|}

Release history

References

2001 debut albums
Artemis Records albums
Khia albums